is a professional Japanese baseball player. He plays pitcher for the Hiroshima Toyo Carp.

On November 16, 2018, he was selected Yomiuri Giants roster at the 2018 MLB Japan All-Star Series exhibition game against MLB All-Stars.

Tone has a Japanese father and a Filipino mother.

References

External links

 NPB.com

1992 births
Living people
Japanese baseball players
Japanese people of Filipino descent
Nihon University alumni
Nippon Professional Baseball pitchers
Baseball people from Kyoto Prefecture
Yomiuri Giants players
Hiroshima Toyo Carp players